Events from the year 1549 in Sweden

Incumbents
 Monarch – Gustav I

Events

 - The male section of the Vadstena Abbey is dissolved and the monks are forced to leave, while the nuns are allowed to remain. 
 - The kings nephew Per Brahe the Elder is appointed riksråd.

Births

 4 April - Princess Elizabeth of Sweden, princess   (died 1597) 
 Date unknown - Helena, Marchioness of Northampton, courtier   (died 1635)

Deaths

 21 November - Ebba Eriksdotter Vasa, mother in law of the king (born unknown date)

References

 
Years of the 16th century in Sweden
Sweden